The Heart of Texas Ryan, aka The Light of Western Stars, is a 1917 American silent Western film starring Tom Mix and Bessie Eyton and directed by E.A. Martin. The film was produced by Sanford Productions. It is Tom Mix's first feature-length film. The film was re-released in 1923 as Single Shot Parker, a title by which it is sometimes called when marketed on home video and DVD.

Plot
The story centers on a love relationship between sharpshooting cowboy Jack "One Shot" Parker and Texas Ryan.

Cast
 Tom Mix as Jack Parker
 Bessie Eyton as Texas Ryan
 George Fawcett as Colonel William Ryan
 Frank Campeau as Dice McAllister
 William Ryno as Antonio Moreno (* as William Rhino)
 Charles K. Gerrard as Senator J. Murray (* as Charles Gerrard)
 Goldie Colwell as Marion Smith

See also
 Tom Mix filmography

References

External links
 
 
 The Heart of Texas Ryan is available for free download from Internet Archive

1917 films
1917 Western (genre) films
American black-and-white films
Articles containing video clips
Selig Polyscope Company films
Silent American Western (genre) films
1910s American films
1910s English-language films